Bazalgette is a surname, originating in the Cévennes region of Southern France.
It is believed that there is a single Bazalgette family that comes from the hamlet of La Bazalgette, 
situated midway between Mende and Ispagnac in the Lozère département. 
All those listed below are related and belong to the British branch of the family. 

Edward Bazalgette, lead guitarist of 1980s rock group the Vapors, a BBC television producer and director and third cousin of Peter Bazalgette
George Bazalgette, an officer in the Royal Marines, and commander of the Royal Marines Light Infantry in colonial-era British Columbia
Ian Willoughby Bazalgette (1918–1944), Canadian recipient of the Victoria Cross and descendant of Joseph Bazalgette
John Bazalgette (1784–1868), Lieutenant Governor of Nova Scotia
Sir Joseph Bazalgette (1819-1891), a Victorian civil engineer responsible for the London sewers.
Léon Bazalgette (1873–1928), French literary critic, biographer and translator
Sir Peter Bazalgette, great-great-grandson of Joseph, chairman of Endemol UK, and producer of Big Brother
Simon Bazalgette, group chief executive of The Jockey Club
Bazalgette Range, a mountain range in British Columbia named for George Bazalgette

French-language surnames